The 2010 Orlando Predators season was the 19th season for the franchise in the Arena Football League. The team was coached by Pat O'Hara and played their home games at Amway Arena. The Predators clinched a playoff berth for the 18th consecutive season by finishing fourth in the American Conference. In the opening round of the playoffs, the Predators defeated the Jacksonville Sharks with a last-second touchdown to win 73–69. Orlando then traveled to Tampa Bay to face the rival Storm for the third time in the season in the conference championship, but lost 62–63 after a would-be game-winning field goal fell short as time expired.

Standings

Regular season schedule

The Predators did not open their season in the league's opening week, but instead in Week 2, on the road against the Battle Wings on April 10. Their first home game of the season took place on April 30 during Week 5 against the Barnstormers. The conclusion of the regular season was at the St. Pete Times Forum in Week 18 against the Storm in another edition of The War on I-4, on July 31.

All times are EDT

Playoff schedule

All times are EDT

Roster

Regular season

Week 1: BYE

Week 2: at Bossier–Shreveport Battle Wings

The Predators lost their first game of the season in a close contest. A pivotal moment occurred as Carlos Martinez lined up to kick a field goal for the last play of the 1st half. Missing the attempt, the live ball was caught off the net by the Battle Wings' P.J. Berry, who was able to return it 55 yards for a touchdown. Instead of cutting into the Battle Wings' lead, the Predators were now down 48–33 at the half. The Preds managed to get within a touchdown at several points of the 2nd half, and scored a touchdown with 7 seconds left in the 4th quarter, but were unable to recover the ensuing onside kick, resulting in the loss. The Predators scored 6 of their 10 touchdowns on rushes, an uncommon sight in arena football.

Week 3: at Jacksonville Sharks

The first ever edition of the "Jive on 95" ended in a loss for the Predators, who were constantly fighting penalties and turnovers throughout the night. Orlando did not lead in the game and was behind 24–7 at the half. The highlight for the Predators came on a pass from Nick Hill to T. T. Toliver. Toliver caught the ball one of the back corners of the end zone and was immediately hit, sent over the sideline walls, but still hung on to make the touchdown. Hill finished with 203 passing yards, but only 3 touchdowns.

Week 4: BYE

Week 5: vs. Iowa Barnstormers

The Predators remained winless following their loss to the Barnstormers. Down by 7 points in the 4th quarter, Marlon Moye-Moore intercepted a Barnstormer pass to set up Orlando on their own 13-yard line. On the drive following the turnover, the Predators had a 1st and goal on the 9-yard line, but were unable to score when Nick Hill threw four consecutive incomplete passes. Getting the ball back on downs, the Barnstormers found the end zone on a 40-yard pass to go up by 14 points with 1:17 left on the clock. It was a deficit the Predators could not overcome in the short amount of time, causing them to fall to 0–3. Hill finished with 237 yards and 4 passing touchdowns, but had 3 interceptions in the game. Derrick Lewis was the leading receiver with 112 yards and 2 touchdowns.

Week 6: at Dallas Vigilantes

Week 7: at Alabama Vipers

Both teams put up a field goal in the 1st quarter, but the Predators trailed by a pair of touchdowns at halftime as they did the week before. However, Orlando outscored Alabama 38–7 and forced three turnovers in the 2nd half. Rayshawn Kizer had two interceptions in the game, one of which in the 4th quarter that led to a 9-yard touchdown reception by T. T. Toliver to end a lengthy drive by Orlando to pull ahead 38–31. Alabama's next drive went three-and-out, turning the ball over on downs to the Predators a yard from the end zone, but the Viper defense put up a goal-line stand and held the Preds to a field goal. The ensuing kickoff was fumbled by Alabama returner C.J. Johnson, and picked up by Orlando's Robert Quiroga at the goal line for an easy touchdown to put the Vipers away.

Nick Hill attempted 51 passes, completing 34 for 273 yards and four touchdowns, also rushing for 29 yards on four carries. Derrick Lewis caught 14 of Hill's passes for 97 yards and one touchdown as the team's leading receiver.

Week 8: vs. Milwaukee Iron

Week 9: vs. Tampa Bay Storm

Week 10: at Tulsa Talons

Week 11: vs. Spokane Shock

Week 12: vs. Jacksonville Sharks

Week 13: at Chicago Rush

Week 14: vs. Cleveland Gladiators

Week 15: vs. Alabama Vipers

Week 16: at Milwaukee Iron

Week 17: vs. Oklahoma City Yard Dawgz

Because the Tampa Bay Storm beat the Alabama Vipers the same night, this win over the Yard Dawgz clinched a playoff berth for the Predators.

Week 18: at Tampa Bay Storm

Playoffs

American Conference Semifinals: at Jacksonville Sharks

American Conference Championship: at Tampa Bay Storm

References

Orlando Predators
Orlando Predators seasons
2010 in sports in Florida
2010s in Orlando, Florida